Dolores Alexander (August 10, 1931 – May 13, 2008) was a lesbian feminist, writer, and reporter. Alexander was the only executive director of the National Organization for Women (NOW) to have resigned because of the homophobic beliefs in the early inception of NOW. She co-opened the feminist restaurant "Mother Courage" with Jill Ward. Until her death, in 2008, she continued to believe in the need for the women's rights movement in contemporary times, stating that "It's bigotry, and I don't know if you can eliminate it".

Early life and career

Dolores Alexander was born in Newark, New Jersey, where she attended Catholic school. In 1961 she graduated from City College of New York with a Bachelor of Arts in Language and Literature. During her senior year she worked at The New York Times as an intern reporter for 10 months, gaining experience in journalism and her first taste of sexism within the news field: while applying for positions at the Times, she was not hired as a "copy girl" by a male employee because it would "cause a revolution in the newsroom". Upon graduation, she worked as a reporter, copy editor and bureau chief at the Newark Evening News from 1961 to 1964. She then went on to serve as a reporter, copy editor and assistant women's editor at Newsday, also serving as a feature writer for the publication's weekend magazine until 1969.

Feminism

Until that time I had always felt like a weirdo, the only person who felt out of step with the world around her. I knew we needed a women's movement. This is what I had been waiting for. – Dolores Alexander, 2007.

In 1966, while working at Newsday, Alexander came across a press release announcing the creation of a new women's rights organization: the National Organization for Women (NOW). She interviewed Betty Friedan and with her media experience, she became chair of the Monitor Subcommittee of the National Task Force on Image of Women in Mass Media. In 1969 she became the first executive director of NOW. She established the headquarters in New York City, and served as an editor of NOW's national newsletter, NOW Acts. She offered to pay the $5 dues for women who could not afford to become members, and fronted a campaign to boost membership nationwide.

In May 1970, she resigned as director to protest NOW's allegedly homophobic practices and policies. Even in her later years, she continued to be disgruntled by the negativity that the words "lesbian" and "feminist" had within the early organization, believing the terms were being used like weapons' to undercut NOW members". Alexander continued to lecture about women's rights and worked with the New Feminist Talent Collective, which was formed by Jacqueline Ceballos to provide the services of speakers about the women's movement.  She co-founded and organized Women Against Pornography and worked with the New York Radical Feminists. Alexander served as board member for the National Association for Repeal of Abortion Laws, an advisory board member for the New York NOW chapter and was a member of the New York Newspaper Women's Club. Alexander was a notable figure in numerous events in the women's movement. She helped end the practice of gender-segregated want ads in The New York Times, was witness to the lesbian purge of the National Organization for Women, participated in 1977's National Women's Conference in Houston, and the UN's Fourth World Conference on Women in Beijing in 1995.

Mother Courage

In May 1972, Alexander and Jill Ward opened Mother Courage, the first feminist restaurant in the United States in Greenwich Village, New York. Located on 342 West 11th Street, the restaurant was named after the heroic female protagonist, Mother Courage, from Bertolt Brecht's eponymous drama. Since the two women had no prior restaurant experience, they borrowed money from several feminist friends and colleagues to renovate an old luncheonette called Benny's Soda Luncheonette and Delicatessen. With the help of many friends and Ward's father, Alexander and Ward completely remodeled the location and turned it into an entirely new restaurant.

Every night for the first couple of weeks of Mother Courage's opening, Ward and Alexander explained their restaurant was at near capacity for dinner. They explained in their press release that, "...Mother Courage had become the hangout and gathering place of feminists around the city. Women felt comfortable coming in for dinner alone, certain they would run into at least one other person they knew and could dine with." This comfort was due to the fact that while the restaurant was technically co-ed, women took priority. After Mother Courage was granted their beer and wine license in 1973, Joyce Vinson (one of the later managers of the restaurant), explained that as a feminist, she would only give the first sip of wine to women even if accompanied by male guests. Checks were also placed within equal distance of diners in order to not make any assumptions about who was going to pay for the meal. Diners, however, weren't the only people to experience this feminist set of ethics. Mother Courage made sure to pay each worker the same salary and had each position rotate amongst staff so that, "every woman [had] an appreciation of the problems of every other woman."

On May 19, 1975, Mother Courage celebrated its third birthday by hosting a champagne buffet with a cake in the shape of the venus symbol. Over 100 guests were invited (many of whom are famous feminists), including Gloria Steinem, Audre Lorde, Kate Millett, and more. Even though Mother Courage was only open until 1977, it inspired many other feminist restaurants to open up around the country. Author Lucy Komisar once described Mother Courage as "more than a restaurant, this is part of a social movement."

Later life and legacy

Alexander's papers are held in the Sophia Smith Collection at Smith College and the Schlesinger Library at Harvard University. As her health declined, she stepped back from the movement spotlight, preferring to watch a new generation of activists "lead the change". On May 13, 2008, Alexander died in Palm Harbor, Florida.

References

External links
Dolores Alexander oral history from the Voices of Feminism Oral History Project
Papers of NOW officers, 1960–1973: A Finding Aid. Schlesinger Library, Radcliffe Institute, Harvard University.
Dolores Alexander papers at the Sophia Smith Collection, Smith College Special Collections

Writers from Newark, New Jersey
American lesbian writers
American feminists
American women journalists
City College of New York alumni
American women restaurateurs
Anti-pornography feminists
1931 births
2008 deaths
National Organization for Women people
Lesbian feminists
LGBT people from New Jersey
Radical feminists
Journalists from New York City
New York Radical Feminists members
20th-century American women writers
21st-century American LGBT people
21st-century American women writers
20th-century American LGBT people